Thomas Rutherford McCarthy (November 30, 1933 – July 21, 2016) was an American thoroughbred racehorse owner and trainer from Louisville, Kentucky, best known for the 2009 Blue Grass Stakes winner and Kentucky Derby runner, General Quarters. From a racing family, his grandfather was a jockey in Ireland and both his father and uncle trained horses at racetracks in New England.

McCarthy had been a racehorse owner and sometimes trainer since 1960 and was unique in the racing industry in that he did all the work of maintaining and conditioning his horses. He is also a former high school teacher and school principal. On May 30, 2008, McCarthy claimed General Quarters for $20,000 out of a maiden race at Churchill Downs. He would later turn down million dollar offers for the horse, telling the TVG Network interviewer "you don't sell a dream."  

McCarthy died on July 21, 2016 in Louisville, Kentucky due to melanoma.

External links
 A Horse and a Derby Dream - TVG-McCarthy, General Quarters in Kentucky Derby

References

1933 births
2016 deaths
Kentucky Derby
American educators
American horse trainers
American racehorse owners and breeders
Sportspeople from New London, Connecticut
Horse trainers from Louisville, Kentucky